Nick Land (born 17 January 1962) is an English philosopher, theorist, short story writer and blogger. He has been described as "the father of accelerationism", and his work has been tied to the development of speculative realism. He was a leader of the 1990s "theory-fiction" collective Cybernetic Culture Research Unit after its original founder cyberfeminist theorist Sadie Plant departed from it. His work departs from the formal conventions of academic writing and embraces a wide range of influences, as well as exploring unorthodox and "dark" philosophical interests.

Land is also known for later developing the anti-egalitarian and anti-democratic ideas behind neo-reaction and the Dark Enlightenment.

Biography 
Land began as a lecturer in Continental Philosophy at the University of Warwick from 1987 until his resignation in 1998. At Warwick, he and Sadie Plant co-founded the Cybernetic Culture Research Unit (CCRU), an interdisciplinary research group described by philosopher Graham Harman as "a diverse group of thinkers who experimented in conceptual production by welding together a wide variety of sources: futurism, technoscience, philosophy, mysticism, numerology, complexity theory, and science fiction, among others". During his time at Warwick, Land participated in Virtual Futures, a series of cyber-culture conferences. Virtual Futures 96 was advertised as “an anti-disciplinary event” and “a conference in the post-humanities”. One session involved Nick Land “lying on the ground, croaking into a mic”, recalls Robin Mackay, while Mackay played jungle records in the background."

In 1992, he published The Thirst for Annihilation: Georges Bataille and Virulent Nihilism. Land published an abundance of shorter texts, many in the 1990s during his time with the CCRU. The majority of these articles were compiled in the retrospective collection Fanged Noumena: Collected Writings 1987-2007, published in 2011.

Land taught at the New Centre for Research & Practice until March 2017, when the Centre ended its relationship with him "following several tweets by Land this year in which he espoused intolerant opinions about Muslims and immigrants".

By 2017, Land resided in Shanghai.

Concepts and influence

Early work 
Land's work with CCRU, as well as his pre-Dark Enlightenment writings, have all been influential to the political philosophy of accelerationism, an idea resembling that of the "fatal strategy" of "ecstasy" in the earlier work of Jean Baudrillard, where "a system is abolished only by pushing it into hyperlogic, by forcing it into an excessive practice which is equivalent to a brutal amortization". Along with the other members of CCRU, Land wove together ideas from the occult, cybernetics, science fiction, and poststructuralist philosophy to try to describe the phenomena of techno-capitalist acceleration.

One of Land's celebrated concepts is "hyperstition," a portmanteau of "superstition" and "hyper" that describes the action of successful ideas in the arena of culture. Hyperstitions are ideas that, once "downloaded" into the cultural mainframe, engender apocalyptic positive feedback cycles. Hyperstitions – by their very existence as ideas – function causally to bring about their own reality. Nick Land describes hyperstition as "the experimental (techno-)science of self-fulfilling prophecies".

Later work 
To reporter Dylan Matthews, Land's Dark Enlightenment philosophy (also known as neo-reactionary movement and abbreviated NRx) opposes egalitarianism, and is sometimes associated with the alt-right or other far-right movements. Matthew states that Land believes democracy restricts accountability and freedom. Shuja Haider notes, "His sequence of essays setting out its principles have become the foundation of the NRx canon." Land insists, however, that “as a populist, and in significant ways anti-capitalist movement, the Alt-Right is a very different beast to NRx.”

His writing has variously discussed themes of scientific racism and eugenics, or what he briefly called "hyper-racism". Land's current version of accelerationism incorporates explicitly racist views and since late 2016 has been increasingly recognised as an inspiration for the alt-right and, according to Vox writer Dylan Matthews, for white supremacist mass murderers.

Land has also written on the implications for philosophy and politics of cryptocurrency, specifically Bitcoin. Drawing from Kantian epistemology, Land has described Bitcoin as "an operational truth procedure". As of August 2019, Land is still working on a book about Bitcoin.

Reception and Influence
Mark Fisher, a British cultural theorist and student of Land's, argued in 2011 that Land's greatest impact so far had been on music and art, rather than on philosophy. The musician Kode9, the artist Jake Chapman, and others studied with or describe their influence by Land, often highlighting Land's inhuman, "technilist," or "delirious" qualities. Fisher underscores in particular how Land's personality during the 1990s could catalyze changes in those engaging with his work through what Kodwo Eshun describes as a manner "immediately open, egalitarian, and absolutely unaffected by academic protocol" which could dramatise "theory as a geopolitico-historical epic."

Nihilist philosopher Ray Brassier, also formerly from the University of Warwick, stated "Nick Land has gone from arguing ‘Politics is dead’, 20 years ago, to this completely old-fashioned, standard reactionary stuff."

Bibliography

Books 
 Heidegger's 'Die Sprache im Gedicht' and the Cultivation of the Grapheme (PhD Thesis, University of Essex, 1987)
 The Thirst For Annihilation: Georges Bataille and Virulent Nihilism (An Essay in Atheistic Religion) (London and New York: Routledge, 1992)
 Machinic Postmodernism: Complexity, Technics and Regulation (with Keith Ansell-Pearson & Joseph A. McCahery) (SAGE Publications, 1996)
 The Shanghai World Expo Guide 2010 (China Intercontinental Press, 2010)
 Shanghai Basics (China Intercontinental Press, 2010)
 Fanged Noumena: Collected Writings 1987-2007, ed. Robin Mackay and Ray Brassier (Urbanomic, 2011). 
 Calendric Dominion (Urbanatomy Electronic, 2013)
 Suspended Animation (Urbanatomy Electronic, 2013)
 Fission (Urbanomic, 2014)
 Templexity: Disordered Loops through Shanghai Time (Urbanatomy Electronic, 2014)
 Phyl-Undhu: Abstract Horror, Exterminator (Time Spiral Press, 2014)
 Shanghai Times (Urbanatomy Electronic, 2014) .
 Dragon Tales: Glimpses of Chinese Culture (Urbanatomy Electronic, 2014) .
 Xinjiang Horizons (Urbanatomy Electronic, 2014) .
 Chasm (Time Spiral Press, 2015) .

Articles 
 
 Crypto-Current: An Introduction to Bitcoin and Philosophy (Šum 10, 2018)

References

External links 

 Outsideness Newsletter (Land's Substack newsletter)
 Outside In (Land's Dark Enlightenment blog, archived from the original on 2020-08-10)
 Urban Future (2.1) (Land's accelerationism blog, archived from the original on 2020-08-10)

1962 births
Living people
Academics of the University of Warwick
Alt-right writers
British bloggers
British conspiracy theorists
20th-century British philosophers
21st-century British philosophers
British expatriates in China
Continental philosophers
Dark Enlightenment
Accelerationism